"Kite" is the fourth track from Kate Bush's 1978 album, The Kick Inside. It was also the B-side to her first single, "Wuthering Heights", released on 20 January 1978. The verses feature a reggae style.

Composition
"Kite" features two modulations created through using the VII or subtonic as a pivot.

Sources

Kate Bush songs
1978 songs
Songs written by Kate Bush